Stallard is a surname of English origin, meaning a person who is valiant or resolute, from the Middle English , meaning "stalwart". The name may refer to:

Albert Stallard (1921–2008), British politician
Arthur Stallard (1892–1917), English footballer
Charles Stallard (1871–1971), South African politician
Fred Stallard (1938–1991), English footballer 
Gwyneth Stallard, British mathematician
H. B. Stallard (1901–1973), English athlete and eye surgeon
Mark Stallard (born 1974), English footballer
Mary Stallard (born 1967), Bishop-elect of Llandaff
Mick Stallard (1944–2002), English cyclist
Percy Stallard (1909–2001), English cyclist
Peter Stallard (1915–1995), British colonial administrator
Tom Stallard (born 1978), English rower
Tony Stallard (born 1958), English artist
Tracy Stallard (1937–2017), American baseball player

References

Surnames of British Isles origin